Huinan is a station on Line 16 of the Shanghai Metro in Pudong, Shanghai.

References

Railway stations in Shanghai
Line 16, Shanghai Metro
Shanghai Metro stations in Pudong
Railway stations in China opened in 2013